Inkazimulo is an album by the South African isicathamiya group Ladysmith Black Mambazo. The members who sang in the Inkazimulo album were Joseph Shabalala Inos Phungula Albert Mazibuko Headman Shabalala Jabulani Dubazana Russell Mthembu Geophrey Mdletshe Abednego Mazibuko Jockey Shabalala Ben Shabalala . It was released in 1985 and was a primarily religious release (as had most of the group's output by this time). The album was recorded a year before the group's collaboration with Paul Simon on his Graceland album and tour.

Track listing
 "E Golgotha" ("At Golgotha")
 "Izindlela Zimbili"
 "Saba Khuluma Izindaba"
 "I Love Jesus"
 "Umthetho"
 "U Jesu Uyeza" ("Jesus, Come to Me")
 "Makabongwe" ("Halleluya")
 "Vater Unser" ("Our Father") - in German
 "Mathathu Lamadoda"
 "Uma Ngimbona"

1985 albums
Ladysmith Black Mambazo albums